Moonfog Productions is a Norwegian record label, founded by Satyricon frontman Satyr and Tormod Opedal. The label was established unofficially in 1992 and released its first record in 1994. The label specialized in black metal and other genres when such were the musical projects of the artists from the main roster.

Artists 

 Darkthrone (from 1995 to 2004)
 Disiplin
 Dødheimsgard
 Eibon
 Gehenna
 Isengard
 Khold
 Neptune Towers
 Satyricon
 Storm
 Thorns
 Wongraven

Visual style 
In the ’90s Moonfog Productions were notable for their higher quality and uniformity of design of records and promotional material, which stood out among contemporary black metal releases in Norway and abroad. The designer Halvor Bodin designed or participated in the design of at least one third of Moonfog’s releases.

List of records 

 [FOG 001] Satyricon: Dark Medieval Times (1993)
 [FOG 002] Neptune Towers: Caravans to Empire Algol (1994)
 [FOG 003] Satyricon: The Shadowthrone (1994)
 [FOG 004] Storm: Nordavind (1995)
 [FOG 005] Darkthrone: Panzerfaust (1995)
 [FOG 006] Wongraven: Fjelltronen
 [FOG 007] Isengard: Høstmørke (1995)
 [FOG 008] Neptune Towers: Transmissions from Empire Algol (1995)
 [FOG 009] Satyricon and Enslaved: The Forest Is My Throne / Yggdrasil (1995) (split)
 [FOG 010] Various Artists: Crusade from the North (a compilation of Moonfog artists) (1996)
 [FOG 011] Darkthrone: Total Death (1996)
 [FOG 012] Satyricon: Nemesis Divina (1996)
 [FOG 013] Darkthrone: Goatlord (1996)
 [FOG 014] Satyricon: Megiddo (1997)
 [FOG 015] Gehenna: Deadlights (1998)
 [FOG 016] Gehenna: Adimiron Black (1998)
 [FOG 017] Dødheimsgard: Satanic Art (1998)
 [FOG 018] Various Artists: Darkthrone: Holy Darkthrone Eight Norwegian bands paying tribute (1998)
 [FOG 019] Thorns and Emperor: Thorns vs. Emperor (1999)
 [FOG 020] Dødheimsgard: 666 International (1999)
 [FOG 021] Satyricon: Intermezzo II (1999)
 [FOG 022] Satyricon: Rebel Extravaganza (1999)
 [FOG 023] Darkthrone: Ravishing Grimness (1999)
 [FOG 024] Various Artists: Moonfog 2000 — A Different Perspective
 [FOG 025] Gehenna: Murder (2000)
 [FOG 026] Thorns: Thorns (2001)
 [FOG 027] Khold: Masterpiss of Pain (2001)
 [FOG 028] Darkthrone: Plaguewielder (2001)
 [FOG 029] Khold: Phantom (2002)
 [FOG 030] Satyricon: Ten Horns – Ten Diadems (2002)
 [FOG 031] Satyricon: Volcano (2002)
 [FOG 032] Darkthrone: Hate Them (2003)
 [FOG 033] :  (2003)
 [FOG 034] Darkthrone: Sardonic Wrath (2004)
 [FOG 035] : Anti-Life (2005)
 [FOG 036] Gehenna: WW (2005)
 [FOG 037] Dødheimsgard (as DHG): Supervillain Outcast (2007)
 [FOGVD 001] Satyricon: Mother North video
 [FOGVD 002] Satyricon: Roadkill Extravaganza video
 [NPR 751, Napalm Records catalogue] Satyricon: Deep Calleth Upon Deep (2017)

See also 

 List of record labels

External links 

 
Moonfog Records section on the website of the designer Halbor Bodin

Norwegian record labels
Record labels established in 1992
Black metal record labels
Heavy metal record labels